Wild in the Streets is the second studio album by American hardcore punk band Circle Jerks. It was released on March 4, 1982, by Faulty Products, a sub-label of I.R.S. Records.

Background
The album featured three cover songs, including the title track, originally by Garland Jeffreys; "Just Like Me", originally performed by Paul Revere & the Raiders; and "Put a Little Love in Your Heart", originally performed by Jackie DeShannon.

The album cover, a photo by punk photographer Ed Colver, featured an image of the band members and others (including Mike Ness of Social Distortion) running in the streets at Columbus Avenue, San Francisco, California.

Reception

Wild in the Streets received a mixed review from Stephen Thomas Erlewine of AllMusic, who gave the album 3 out of 5 stars, claiming that it does not have "the wild, appealingly offensive mixture of crude lyrics and frenetic riffs that made the Circle Jerks' debut, Group Sex". However, Erlewine added that "there are enough tracks that nearly make the mark -- including a tongue-in-cheek cover of 'Put a Little Love in Your Heart' and the title track, which is a version of the theme song to the '60s teen exploitation flick of the same name -- to make it worthwhile for Orange County punk fanatics".

Reissues
In 1988, the album was remixed and reissued on Frontier Records, both on its own in cassette and vinyl formats, and paired with the band's debut as Group Sex/Wild in the Streets on CD.

A 40th anniversary edition came out in 2022, with a 20-page booklet featuring an album history by L.A. music writer Chris Morris.

Track listing

Personnel
 Keith Morris – lead vocals
 Greg Hetson – guitar, backing vocals
 Roger Rogerson – bass
 Lucky Lehrer – drums

Production
 David Anderle; Gary Hirstius – production
 Steve Katz – engineering
 Paul McKenna – assistant engineer
 Frank Deluna – mixing
 John Golden – mastering
 Ed Colver – front cover photo
 Glen E. Friedman – back cover photos
 Carl Grasso; Shawn Kerri – artwork

References

1982 albums
Circle Jerks albums
Albums produced by David Anderle
Frontier Records albums
Faulty Products albums